The 2017 Orange Bowl was a college football bowl game played on December 30, 2017 at the Hard Rock Stadium in Miami Gardens, Florida.  The contest was televised on ESPN with a radio broadcast on ESPN Radio, kickoff was at 8:00 PM (EST).  It was one of the 2017–18 bowl games that concluded the 2017 FBS football season.  The 84th Orange Bowl, the game was sponsored by the Capital One financial services organization, and was officially known as the Capital One Orange Bowl.

The 2017 Orange Bowl featured the Wisconsin Badgers (12–1), champions of the Big Ten Conference West Division, and the Miami Hurricanes (10–2), champions of the Atlantic Coast Conference Coastal Division.  Wisconsin beat Miami by a score of 34–24.

Teams
The teams playing in the Orange Bowl game were the Miami Hurricanes and the Wisconsin Badgers.  Prior to kickoff, the all-time series between the two teams was tied at 2 games apiece; the most recent meeting being at the 2009 Champs Sports Bowl, where the Badgers defeated the Hurricanes by a score of 20–14.

Related events
 Selection Sunday, December 3, 2017
 Orange Bowl Fan Fest, December 30, 2017

Game summary

Scoring summary

Statistics

References

2017–18 NCAA football bowl games
2017
2017
2017
2017 in sports in Florida
December 2017 sports events in the United States